The General Confession is a prayer of contrition in various Christian denominations, including Anglicanism, Methodism, and Roman Catholicism.

Anglicanism and Methodism 
In Anglicanism, the "General Confession" is the act of contrition in Thomas Cranmer's 1548 order of Communion and later in the Book of Common Prayer.

In Methodism, the General Confession is the same act of contrition in The Sunday Service of the Methodists and Methodist liturgical texts descended from it. It is taught to probationary members seeking full membership in Methodist connexions, being included in The Probationer's Catechism.

Roman Catholicism 
As understood by St. Ignatius of Loyola, General Confession is a form of Confession whereby one spends 3 to 10 days preparing for a confession of all one's 'sins up to that time.' The main goal of the "general confession" is to turn one's life from one of sin to a more devout one. The Spiritual Exercises of St. Ignatius have done much to popularise this form of confession, with such a confession being the significant end-point of the First Week of his Spiritual Exercises.

St. Francis de Sales, in his Introduction to the Devout Life, also addresses General Confession.

See also
Spiritual Exercises of Ignatius of Loyola
Society of Jesus
Retreat (spiritual)
Manchurian revival (Protestant)

References

Spiritual retreats
Ignatian spirituality